Ettore Dulay, better known by his stage name Thor Dulay or simply as Thor, is a Filipino singer-songwriter and vocal coach.

Biography
Born in Panabo City, Davao del Norte, he was a choirboy who began singing professionally at the age of nineteen. He finished his high school at Maryknoll High School of Panabo.

Musical career
He graduated from Ateneo de Davao University before trying his luck in Manila with his band, Extreme Mix, now known as Myxtreme. He has also provided backing vocals for artists such as Luke Mejares and Jay-R.

His debut album was released in 2004 by Evolution Music, distributed by Warner Music.

Duets with Thor & Mccoy  was a regular feature on Wave 89.1 and tracks from this were collected for his second solo album Soul Obsessions: Duets With Thor.

He was a part of Satya Project, an R&B-Soul-Jazz band led by Marcos Sainz and Juan Galiardo. The band recorded their first album, Shine A Light, in Spain. He was able to perform as front act for David Foster at the Araneta, won an Awit Award in 2004 for Best Collaboration with Nina, and another award in 2005 for the cut Kasalanan Nga Ba?" as Best Theme Song for that year's MMFF.

As a backing vocalist, Thor worked with several musical bands for various television shows such as Gandang Gabi Vice.

Personal life
He is married to non-showbiz wife Mai Dulay, with his baby boy.

Dulay is a graduate of Ateneo de Davao University.

2013: The Voice of the Philippines
He auditioned for the first season of The Voice of the Philippines, which aired on ABS-CBN on Saturday, 15 June 2013. He sang "I Have Nothing" by Whitney Houston that had all four coaches offer him a place on their respective teams. He ultimately picked apl.de.ap to be his coach.

Performances/results

2014: Philpop 2014 and fourth studio album
On 26 July 2014, Thor took part as an interpreter for the song entry titled "The Only One" written by Venelyn San Pedro at the third Philippine Popular Music Festival. On 30 January 2015, he released his fourth studio album titled "Master Of Soul" under ABS-CBN's Star Music. The music video for its carrier single is "Paano Ko Sasabihin" premiered on 25 January.

Discography

Studio album

References

1980 births
Living people
21st-century Filipino male singers
People from Davao City
The Voice of the Philippines contestants
Ateneo de Davao University alumni
Star Music artists